The ATP Challenger Series is the second-tier tour for professional tennis organised by the Association of Tennis Professionals (ATP). The 1990 ATP Challenger Series calendar comprises 71 tournaments, with prize money ranging from $25,000 up to $100,000.

Schedule

January

February

March

April

May

June

July

August

September

October

November

December

Statistical information 
These tables present the number of singles (S) and doubles (D) titles won by each player and each nation during the season, within all the tournament categories of the 1990 ATP Challenger Series. The players/nations are sorted by: 1) total number of titles (a doubles title won by two players representing the same nation counts as only one win for the nation); 2) a singles > doubles hierarchy; 3) alphabetical order (by family names for players).

Titles won by player

Titles won by nation

See also 
 1990 ATP Tour
 1990 WTA Tour
 Association of Tennis Professionals
 International Tennis Federation

References

External links 
 Official ATP World Tour Website: Results Archive
 ITF Tennis: Tournament Search

1990 in tennis
ATP Challenger Tour seasons